The semilunar hiatus or hiatus semilunaris, is a crescent-shaped groove in the lateral wall of the nasal cavity just inferior to the ethmoid bulla.  It is the location of the openings of the maxillary sinuses. It is bounded inferiorly and anteriorly by the sharp concave margin of the uncinate process of the ethmoid bone, superiorly by the ethmoid bulla, and posteriorly by the middle nasal concha.

Sinus drainage
Following the curve anteriorly leads into the infundibulum of the frontonasal duct, which drains the frontal sinus.

The anterior ethmoidal cells of the ethmoidal sinus open into the front part of the infundibulum as well.  In slightly over 50% of subjects, this is directly continuous with the frontonasal duct from the frontal air sinus. When the anterior end of the uncinate process fuses with the front part of the bulla, however, this continuity is interrupted and the frontonasal duct then drains directly into the anterior end of the middle meatus.

The ostium for the maxillary sinus opens posteriorly in this groove and is the largest ostium within the semilunar hiatus.

References

External links
 

Nose